Live at Sweet Basil is a 1989 live album by McCoy Tyner released on the Japanese King label. It was recorded in May 1989 and features performances by Tyner's trio which included bassist  Avery Sharpe and drummer Aaron Scott at the Sweet Basil jazz club in New York City. The Allmusic review by Scott Yanow calls the album "a definitive look at McCoy Tyner in the late '80s".

Track listing
 "Crescent" (Coltrane) – 10:29  
 "Monk's Dream" (Monk) – 9:35  
 "Darn That Dream" (DeLange, Van Heusen) – 8:18  
 "Sweet Basil Swing" – 6:30  
 "'Round Midnight" (Monk) – 9:51  
 "Yesterdays" (Harbach, Kern) – 9:55  
 "Rio" – 8:47  
 "Don't Blame Me" (Fields, McHugh) – 4:20  
 "Just in Time" (Comden, Green, Styne) – 10:45  
 "Naima" (Coltrane) – 2:51  
 "Will You Still Be Mine?" (Adair, Dennis) – 10:46  
All compositions by McCoy Tyner except as indicated
Recorded at Sweet Basil, NYC, May 19 & 20, 1989.

Personnel
McCoy Tyner – piano
Avery Sharpe – bass
Aaron Scott – drums

References

1989 live albums
McCoy Tyner live albums